Self-Portrait is a 1660 oil on canvas painting by the Dutch artist Rembrandt, one of over 40 self-portraits by Rembrandt. Painted when the artist was fifty-four, it has been noted as a work in which may be seen "the wrinkled brow and the worried expression the troubled condition of his mind". Part of the Benjamin Altman Collection, it has been in the Metropolitan Museum of Art since 1913.

Description
The Altman portrait is dated 1660, when he was fifty-four years old. This was a year of anxiety for him. He had just been declared bankrupt. He saw his collection of art treasures disposed of at auction and himself deserted by his pupils and his friends, with no studio of his own in which to set up his easel. In this portrait we have a work of mature years, when he brought all the skill and resources of a lifetime to its creation.
The lift of the eyebrows that wrinkle his forehead is that of whimsical impatience, yet the spark in his eyes denies defeat. The mouth is drawn and the mark of undeserved neglect is evident in the premature wrinkles, but a certain merry pride lurks in the tilted cap and raised head. A pang of pity shoots through us, only to be replaced by one of keen satisfaction that he, the neglected, is remembered and they, the aristocrats, are forgotten.
Though this great artist lived several years longer, they were years of misery, and he painted only one more great work, "The Syndics of the Cloth Hall," now in the Ryks Museum in Amsterdam. His great reputation suffered an almost total eclipse, although to-day he is probably the most popular painter that ever lived. Yet he never lost his courage, and as we see him in this portrait he carries his head bravely and wears his hat jauntily, as if in defiance of the evils that engulfed him. Heretofore we may have felt acquainted with Rembrandt the painter, but now we know Rembrandt the man; for just so he must have looked to his neighbors in the troublous year 1660.

Composition
Technically this portrait shows Rembrandt at his best. The hat, a rich black, and the background, a warm green, are smoothly painted. The shadows in the face are thin, warm, and transparent, while the lighter parts, as on the cheek, are laid on with a well-loaded brush, suggesting the texture of the flesh and made to glow with color. Over a red waistcoat Rembrandt wears a heavy, brownish coat.

Provenance
Unknown date: Duc de Valentinois, Paris
between 15 July 1802 and 17 July 1802: anonymous sale at Lebrun, Paris (auction house)
by 1825: William Waldegrave, 1st Baron Radstock (1753–1825)
13 May 1826: purchased by Alexander Baring, 1st Baron Ashburton (1774–1848), at the sale of the collection of William Waldegrave, 1st Baron Radstock at Christie's, London
1848: inherited by Bingham Baring, 2nd Baron Ashburton (1799–1864), from Alexander Baring, 1st Baron Ashburton
1864: inherited by Francis Baring, 3rd Baron Ashburton (1800–1868), from Bingham Baring, 2nd Baron Ashburton
1868: inherited by Alexander Baring, 4th Baron Ashburton (1835–1889), from Francis Baring, 3rd Baron Ashburton
1889: inherited by Francis Baring, 5th Baron Ashburton, from Alexander Baring, 4th Baron Ashburton
by 1908: Arthur J. Sulley & Co. (art dealers), London
1909/1910: obtained by Charles Sedelmeyer (art dealer), Paris
1909/1910: purchased by Benjamin Altman (1840–1913), New York, from Charles Sedelmeyer, Paris
1913: bequeathed to Metropolitan Museum of Art, New York, by Benjamin Altman, New York

Related self-portraits by Rembrandt

Those who happen to be familiar with the self-portrait of a year or so earlier, belonging to Henry C. Frick, will find a comparison of the moods of that picture and our work an interesting one. In the portrait owned by Mr. Frick, though it was also painted in a troubled time, he paints himself as though he were a philosopher or prophet to whom all things but his own thoughts are indifferent. In the Altman picture he is prematurely aged by his troubles and is pestered with worries, "the little cares and anxieties of daily life." His forehead is wrinkled and the mouth is drawn, but the cap is tilted a little jauntily on one side and the head is erect and proud.

Notes

External links

The Metropolitan Museum of Art
Long Island University
Copy at Victoria & Albert Museum

1660 paintings
Self-portraits by Rembrandt
17th-century portraits
Paintings in the collection of the Metropolitan Museum of Art